Karakonam is a town in Kunnathukal, Perumkadavila Block Panchayat, of Thiruvananthapuram district in the Indian state of Kerala.  It is located around 30 km from Thiruvananthapuram. It is home to the Dr.Somervell Memorial CSI Medical college

MEDICAL STORES
 KICHU MEDICALS KARAKKONAM

Politics
The panchayat of Kunnathukal

References

Villages in Thiruvananthapuram district